Cacostatia saphira is a moth of the subfamily Arctiinae. It was described by Otto Staudinger in 1875. It is found in Mexico, Guatemala and Panama.

References

External links
 Bold Systems

Arctiinae
Moths described in 1875